Bernalillo High School is a public high school in Bernalillo, New Mexico, United States. The school is a part of the Bernalillo Public Schools district and is the only high school in the district. The mascot is the Spartan.

Service area
The service area of its school district, and therefore the high school itself, includes most of Bernalillo as well as Algodones, Cochiti, Cochiti Lake, La Madera, Peña Blanca, Placitas, Pueblo of Sandia Village, San Felipe Pueblo, Santo Domingo Pueblo, and most of Santa Ana Pueblo.

Athletics
Bernalillo High School competes in the District 2-AAAA.

References

External links
 Official website
 Bernalillo Public Schools

Public high schools in New Mexico
Schools in Sandoval County, New Mexico
Educational institutions established in 1952
1952 establishments in New Mexico